Opalanki  is a village in the administrative district of Gmina Ozorków, within Zgierz County, Łódź Voivodeship, and in central Poland.

The village has a population of 50.

References

Opalanki